Rugby union was first introduced into Lebanon both by the mandated French forces, and subsequently by the Lebanese returning from the diaspora. Introduced into many other parts of the Middle East, by the British military in the mid 20th Century, rugby has begun to develop across the Arabian peninsula with the establishment of many national rugby federations and the development of the Dubai Sevens, which has helped generate interest in the sport in Arabic-speaking nations.

Formally, rugby union in Lebanon has been played since the inception of the Beirut Phoenicians Rugby Union Club in 1995 at the request of the British Consulate. The club was formed in order to play visiting teams from British War ships. The Beirut Phoenicians Rugby Union Club represented Lebanon as the only rugby union club in both locally played matches and International tournaments for a number of years.

In 2009, the Lebanese Rugby Union Federation was established with the intention of developing the game at a local level and representing Lebanon on the international rugby scene. The Federation was formed by representatives of the Beirut Phoenicians, Ahed/Reay, Jamhour Black Lions and Grey Wolves Rugby Clubs.  In 2013, the Jounieh Rugby Club was formed and applied to join the LRUF.  During this period the Lebanese Rugby Union Federation was recognised as a member of the Asian Rugby Federation Union. In recent seasons the Senior Lebanese National Rugby Union team, the "Phoenix" has demonstrated its improving development through successful tournament victories in 2012–2013 international season winning the Asian Five Nations Division 4 tournament to advance in 2013 to the 3rd Division of the Asian Five Nations Competition.

The Current State of Lebanese Rugby Union

The Lebanese Rugby Union Federation at the present time is made up of five teams, which play in domestic tournaments including,
 The Blue Stars
 The Beirut Phoenicians
 The Jamhour Black Lions
 The Jounieh Dragons
 The Froggies Beyrouth

It is from these clubs that players are selected to play for the Lebanese National team, which is often supplemented by expatriate Lebanese players from nations with large Lebanese expatriate communities with an interest in Rugby such as England and Australia. The Lebanese National team competes in the Asian Rugby Federation Union competition and is very competitive regionally. The Lebanese National team, the "Phoenix" recently won a Middle Eastern 7s tournament in Dubai and the Asian Five Nations Division 4 tournament against Pakistan, Uzbekistan and Laos to advance to the 3rd Division in the 2013 – 2014 season.

While the fortunes of the Lebanese Rugby Union Federation have been on the rise in recent seasons the Federation continues to receive very little in the way of funding and relies heavily on intermittent sponsorship. The Lebanese Ministry of Youth and Sport provides the Lebanese Rugby Union Federation with a minimal amount of funding yet this pales in comparison with the generous allowances provided annually by other Arab nations to their Rugby Union Federations.

There is a great deal of potential for rugby union to be successful both in Lebanon and internationally. In order to achieve this potential there needs to be an expansion of the current domestic club competition and a greater emphasis on the development of the game at a junior and schools level. Rugby union promises to be an excellent way to provide opportunities for Lebanese youth to focus their energies on positive life affirming team activities. Yet with the limited playing pitches and funding, rugby union in Lebanon will remain a limited sport and will take many years if not decades to develop.

Domestically

Lebanese Club Championship

Domestically, the Lebanese Rugby Union Federation is in the process of expanding the reach and popularity of Rugby in Lebanon through the incorporation of more teams to expand the Lebanese Club Championship.

The Lebanese Rugby Union Federation's representative side, "Phoenix Select XV" regularly competes in rugby matches against visiting United Nations Interim Force troop teams including teams from the French, Irish and Fijian battalions stationed in Southern Lebanon.

The Lebanese Rugby Union Federation also has begun the development of junior rugby programs and junior tournaments to encourage the playing of rugby in schools. In 2018 five school's teams competed in the LRUF Student's Cup including College Notre Dame Jamhour, Lycée, American Community School and International College and two teams from to independent junior academies the Froggies Academy and the Blue Stars Academy.

2018 has also seen the rise in women's domestic rugby with senior and junior teams from the Blue Stars, Beirut Aconites, International College and American Community School participating in the LRUF's Women's Rugby competition.

Internationally

The Lebanese National Rugby Union Team, the "Phoenix" has participated in a number of international tournaments and test matches since the inception of the Federation in 2009. The Phoenix have played international matches against Qatar, Jordan, Pakistan, Uzbekistan and the UAE in the XV's version of the game. They have also played against the UAE, Afghanistan and Iran in the West Asian 7's Tournament.

The Phoenix will participate in the "Asian Five Nations" Division 3 West tournament commencing on 19 June 2014 in Lahore, Pakistan. The Phoenix will compete against national teams from host nation Pakistan, India and Uzbekistan. The winners of this tournament should advance to A5N Division 2 in the 2015 season.

The Phoenix are also scheduled to participate in the 2014 Asian Games to be held in Inchon, Korea in October.

Lebanese Expatriate Rugby Participation

Internationally, the Lebanese expatriate community has had a profound impact upon the game of Rugby Union. Many Lebanese expatriates and people of Lebanese descent have played at an international level and have contributed to the advancement of Rugby Union both on and off the field.

Rugby Union is described as 'the game that is played in heaven' as such it is fitting that those early settlers and their descendants who hail from the land of the 'Cedars of God' would come to thrive at such a game.

The Australian Lebanese community has had a long and proud association with the game of rugby union commencing within a short period of time after the establishment of the Syrian (Lebanese) colony in Australia. In 1888, George P Barbour was selected to represent the New South Wales Waratahs against Queensland and from 1894 to 1897 All (Alf) Hanna played 16 Caps for the Waratahs.

Undoubtedly, the most distinguished of all rugby players of Australian Lebanese descent is former Australian Wallabies Captain and President of the Australian Rugby Football Union (ARU), Sir Nicholas Shehadie AC. OBE. Sir Nicholas began playing at the age of 15 and played more than 175 club games for the famous 'Galloping Greens', the Randwick Rugby Club.

His career eventually spanned almost five decades representing the Waratahs with 37 caps and by age 20, Sir Nicholas was selected to represent Australia against the New Zealand All Blacks in the Second Test at the Sydney Cricket Ground in 1947. Sir Nicholas recalls with great irony that his selection in the test against the All Blacks was the first test match he had ever witnessed.

While not being able to definitively single out a greatest career highlight, Sir Nicholas remembers with great fondness his selection in the nine-month tour of the United Kingdom, France and North America in 1947/48. Eventually playing more than 100 games for the Wallabies, Sir Nicholas captained Australia three times. The Australian Rugby Union still considers him to be "one of the world's best props, Sir Nicholas Shehadie set a new Australian record for being the most capped Wallaby, with 30 Tests to his name between 1947 and 1958."

One of his most memorable experiences on tour with the Australian Wallabies was the reception that he and his Wallaby teammates received from the Lebanese community while touring South Africa in 1953. The community lovingly adopted the Wallabies as their team and in very Lebanese fashion sought to inquire with the tour manager as to Sir Nicholas' marital status. Sir Nicholas laughingly recalls that when he became Captain of the Wallabies it seemed that he suddenly had many more relatives in the Australian Lebanese community.

Sir Nicholas was selected to tour Europe with the Wallabies in 1958, ten years after his previous tour. At the end of the tour, he was selected to represent the prestigious Barbarian Football Club against his beloved Wallabies. Neither feat had ever been accomplished by any other player. His illustrious rugby career did not end with his playing retirement. He went on to become the President of the Australian Rugby Football Union from 1980 to 1986 and was instrumental in establishing the inaugural Rugby World Cup, which is now the third largest sporting event after the Olympics and the Football World Cup. Sir Nicholas was inducted into the ARU Hall of Fame in 2006 and the International Rugby Board's Hall of Fame in 2011.

During Sir Nicholas' era there were a number of Australians of Lebanese descent playing rugby union at grade or state level. Nick Aboud played 1 cap for the Waratahs in 1935 and Sir Nicholas' brother, George Shehadie played for the Eastern Suburbs Rugby Club. George went on to be selected for the Waratahs for 3 caps in 1960.

While Manager of the 1981 Australian Wallabies tour of the United Kingdom, Sir Nicholas had the regrettable honour of having to farewell Wallabies' Hooker, Bruce Malouf who unfortunately broke his ankle at a training session four days after arriving in the UK. Bruce, an Australian Schoolboy representative and 9 cap member of the Waratahs squad from 1980 to 1983, eventually played one Test match for the Wallabies against the New Zealand All blacks in August 1982.

Current New South Wales Waratahs Head Coach, Michael Cheika played more than 300 games for the Randwick Rugby Club, captaining Randwick from 1997 to 1999 winning seven Shute Shield Premierships. He represented Australia in the Under 20s and played three games for the Waratahs in 1997. Michael made a successful transition into coaching winning the European Championship with Leinster Rugby Union Club. Michael Cheika played for Randwick against the World Champion All Blacks at Coogee Oval in 1988, the only domestic Australian Club to play an international team in the 20th century.

Yet it is not just the New South Welshmen of Lebanese descent who have represented at the highest levels of rugby union. Queenslanders have a fierce reputation for being hard-hitting and powerful rugby players with Brendon Nasser being no exception. Playing in the position of flanker, Brendon had an illustrious rugby career with Queensland from 1986 to 1992 before being selected to represent Australia as a Wallaby in 1989/90. Brendon played eight Test matches for the Wallabies and was a member of the 1991 World Cup winning squad. In 1992, his final year of international representative rugby, Brendon was selected to play in a World XV against New Zealand to celebrate the All Blacks' Centenary of Rugby.

Many younger players of Lebanese descent have represented Australia at an international Schoolboy level including David Azar, Nicholas Ghattas, David Basha, Robert Shehadie and Anthony Nehme.

In recognition of the contribution of Australians of Lebanese descent to the game of rugby union, a new rugby union club known as the Australian Lebanese Hawkers has been formed. The team is named in honour of the early Lebanese settlers who traditionally worked as hawkers throughout the Australian countryside. The team is scheduled to play an inaugural charity exhibition match against the Lebanese Senior National Rugby Union team and will be vying for the 'Sir Nicholas Shehadie Trophy.'

Other players of Lebanese origin that have played at an international level of Rugby include New Zealand All Black, Joe Karam. An extremely hard trainer at a club level, Karam was named as an All Black for the 1972–73 tour of the British Isles and France. He played 10 test matches for the All Blacks between 1972 and 1975. Joe Karam was inducted into the Lebanese Rugby Union Federation's Hall of Fame in a ceremony in 2013 for his contribution to international rugby.
Omar Hasan, who is Lebanese, phase been voted as the best tighthead prop by world rugby

See also
Lebanon national rugby union team
Rugby union in Syria, neighbouring country in a similar situation.

References

External links
  
   
 http://www.asian5nations.com/ARFU 
"Islam and Rugby" on the Rugby Readers review